Behind the Green Door is an extended play (EP) by American musician Laurel Halo, released on May 20, 2013, through Hyperdub. The EP was influenced by the techno music of Detroit and the United Kingdom. The track "Throw" was recorded in London using a detuned piano.

Critical reception
Behind the Green Door received generally favorable reviews from music critics, with a Metacritic weighed aggregate score of 74 out of 100 based on eight reviews. Drowned in Sound critic George Bass wrote, "It's as direct and aggressive as any of Halo's floor-orientated material, and shows that, while she may turn more heads with more compositional, vocal-driven tracks, Hyperdub and Halo can move into new areas, one where syncopated drum lines break for vintage warehouse rhythms and the chill-out room has been invaded by pianists and a house DJ."

Paula Mejia of Consequence of Sound wrote, "Like Halo’s previous work, Behind The Green Door coos the listener to listen often and closely, while instilling that sense of intrigue that unexplained mysteries leave you with." Writing for Exclaim!, Ian Schober stated that the EP "contains some of the most comfortably weird grooves we've heard from Laurel Halo." Pitchforks Nick Neyland said the EP "feels more in tune with decay and exploitation in sexual portrayal, the numbness accrued from a constant barrage of imagery, than anything that's notionally "sexy."

Track listing

References

Laurel Halo albums
Hyperdub EPs
2013 EPs